Jason Morgan is the name of:

 W. Jason Morgan (born 1935), American geophysicist
 Jason Morgan (ice hockey) (born 1976), Canadian ice hockey player
 Jason Morgan (discus thrower) (born 1982), Jamaican discus thrower
 Jason Morgan (politician) (born 1989), American politician 
 Jason Morgan (General Hospital), a fictional character on the American soap opera General Hospital